Eye Candy is an American thriller television series that premiered on MTV on January 12, 2015. The series was developed by Christian Taylor, and is based on the 2004 novel of the same name by R. L. Stine. Eye Candy stars Victoria Justice as Lindy Sampson, a tech genius who goes on the hunt for a serial killer in New York while searching for her lost sister Sara. On February 11, 2014, Eye Candy was picked up for a 10-episode first season. Justice revealed on April 18, 2015, that the series had been cancelled.

Premise
Eye Candy centers on tech genius Lindy (Victoria Justice), a 21-year-old woman who is persuaded by her roommate, Sophia (Kiersey Clemons), to begin online dating. Unfortunately, she begins to suspect that one of her suitors might be a deadly cyber stalker. She teams up with her friends, a band of hackers, to solve the murders he committed, while unleashing her own style of justice on the streets of New York City in an attempt to find her sister, Sara (Jordyn DiNatale), who was kidnapped three years earlier by an unknown suspect.

Cast and characters

Main
 Victoria Justice as Lindy Sampson, a 21-year-old hacker, who dropped out of MIT after her sister was kidnapped, and is set on finding the Flirtual killer
 Casey Deidrick as Tommy Calligan, an officer at the NYPD
 Harvey Guillén as George Reyes, Lindy's coworker, close friend, and confidant
 Kiersey Clemons as Sophia, Lindy's roommate and best friend
 John Garet Stoker as Connor, Sophia's best friend and Lindy's frenemy

Recurring
 Ryan Cooper as Jake Bolin, one of Lindy's love interests 
 Melanie Nicholls-King as Sgt. Catherine Shaw, the head of the Cyber Crimes Unit of the NYPD
 Eric Sheffer Stevens as Hamish Stone
 Marcus Callender as Detective Yeager, Detective Calligan's partner
 Rachel Kenney as Detective Pascal
 Theodora Miranne as Tessa
 Nils Lawton as Reiss

Guest stars
 Daniel Lissing as Ben, Tommy's former partner in the Cyber Crimes Unit, who fell in love with Lindy. He was murdered by the Flirtual killer.
 Jordyn DiNatale as Sara Sampson, Lindy's sister, who was allegedly abducted
 David Carranza as Peter, one of the guys Lindy found on Flirtual, who was murdered by the Flirtual killer
 Peter Mark Kendall as Bubonic, a hacker
 Taylor Rose as Amy Bryant
 Daniel Flaherty as Max Jenner
 Ariane Rinehart as Jessica
 Erica Sweany as Julia Becker
 Ted Sutherland as Jeremy
 Erin Wilhelmi as Erika Williams
 Ebonée Noel as Mary Robertson, Catherine's niece

Episodes

Production and development
A pilot episode of Eye Candy was ordered on September 13, 2013, by MTV. The first and unaired pilot of Eye Candy, which starred Victoria Justice, Harvey Guillen, Justin Martin, Lilan Bowden, Nico Tortorella, and Olesya Rulin, was written by Emmy Grinwis and directed by Catherine Hardwicke.

On February 11, 2014,  the series was announced as picked up for a 10-episode first season, with the first episode being reshot and all the roles being recast except for those of Justice and Guillen. On September 16, 2014, the cast was extended with Casey Deidrick, Kiersey Clemons, and John Garet Stoker all becoming series regulars.

Production began on September 15, 2014, and ended on December 20, 2014, in Brooklyn, New York City.

Reception
It received mixed reviews. Tim Stack of Entertainment Weekly stated, "While Justice is a winning actress, she's miscast here and not helped by a story line that feels like one of those old USA TV movies that would have starred Shannen Doherty and Rob Estes." Robert Lloyd of the Los Angeles Times said, "The prologue is well-handled, suspenseful and alarming, but much of what follows seems at least a little bit silly or confused." More positively, Adam Smith of the Boston Herald said, "With the suspenseful Eye Candy, we have a pretty good show, especially for teens who get a thrill out of being creeped out." The series' pilot episode holds a score of 54/100 on review aggregating website Metacritic.

References

External links
 

2015 American television series debuts
2015 American television series endings
2010s American crime drama television series
2010s American LGBT-related drama television series
2010s American mystery television series
2010s American teen drama television series
American thriller television series
English-language television shows
MTV original programming
Fictional portrayals of the New York City Police Department
Television shows based on American novels
Television shows filmed in New York City
Television shows set in New York City